Kurak or Kūrak may refer to:

People
Mário Kurák (born 1983), Slovak footballer
Adam Kurak (born 1985), Russian wrestler

Places
Kurak, Tangestan, Bushehr Province, Iran
Kurak, Fars, Iran
Kurak, Ilam, Iran